Riding is a surname. Notable people with the surname include:

Douglas Riding (born 1943), Australian air marshal
Joanna Riding (born 1967), English actress
Laura Riding (1901–1991), American poet and writer